Antirrhinum siculum is a species of herb in the family Plantaginaceae. They have simple, broad leaves. Individuals can grow to 4 cm.

Sources

References 

siculum
Flora of Malta